The Humanist Outlook is a quarterly magazine published by the Indian Humanist Union.

History and profile
The first issue of Humanist Outlook was published in Autumn 1966. The founding editor was Narsingh Narain, who also founded the Indian Humanist Union in 1954 under the name The Society for the Promotion of Freedom of Thought. Then the magazine was edited by his son, Prakash Narain. The magazine is based in Delhi.

References

External links
 Summer 2008 issue of the magazine

English-language magazines published in India
Magazines established in 1966
Magazines published in Delhi
Quarterly magazines published in India
1966 establishments in Delhi